Zier Cors, or Zier Corners, is an unincorporated community in Carroll County, Illinois, United States. Zier Cors is located north of Lanark in Cherry Grove–Shannon Township, at the junction of Illinois Route 72 and Illinois Route 73.

The community takes its name from the Zier family. The Ziers were a prominent farming family of the area.

References

Unincorporated communities in Carroll County, Illinois
Unincorporated communities in Illinois